Coffee Friends is a South Korean reality show program on tvN starring Yoo Yeon-seok, Son Ho-jun, Choi Ji-woo and Yang Se-jong.

It aired on tvN on January 4 and ended on March 8, 2019, broadcast on Fridays at 19:10 (KST).

Synopsis 
On a tangerine farm in Seogwipo, Jeju Island, four actors run a cafe where they serve brunch to visitors. The show was inspired by a donation project that Yoo Yeon-seok and Son Ho-jun ran each month in 2018. During the donation project, the two friends gave free cups of coffee in exchange for donations of any amount.

In this cafe, the menu does not list prices. Instead, customers are encouraged to donate what they want for their food and beverages.

The total profits earned by the project, 12,093,977₩ (roughly 10,200$), were donated in full to a charity for disabled children at the end of the show.

Cast

Ratings

References

External links 
 Official Website

2019 South Korean television series debuts
TVN (South Korean TV channel) original programming
South Korean reality television series
South Korean cooking television series
South Korean television shows
Television series set in restaurants
Korean-language television shows
2019 South Korean television series endings